TextFree (formerly called Pinger and sometimes stylized as textfree) is a mobile application and web service that allows users to send and receive text messages, as well as make and receive VoIP phone calls, for free over the internet. The service costs nothing because it is supported by ads, but users have the option of paying for an ad-free version with enhanced features. TextFree was developed by American telecommunications provider Pinger, Inc. It was released in 2006.  

TextFree states on its website that it has more than 130 million users (as of September 2022).

The mobile app runs on both iOS and Android devices, and there is a desktop version available for download on macOS and Windows. Users can also access TextFree's services online via a web browser. Competitors include GOGII, Optini and WhatsApp.

Usage
Users can communicate with other who do not use the app via texting and calling. Users can call within US and Canada, while texting is free in 35 countries. New accounts receive a new phone number and 60 free minutes. Users may also communicate with any other user worldwide. Moreover, Textfree has a web based version of its application that allows users to send and receive text messages directly from computer. They provide a permanent number to their users, which they can use to send free texts for lifetime.

References

Android (operating system) software
IOS software
Instant messaging clients
Cross-platform software
Communication software